The Alta Valsesia Natural Park is a nature reserve\regional park in Piedmont, in Italy.

It is an Alpine park considered the highest in Europe. It includes Signalkuppe (on the Italian side), Monte Rosa, Val Vogna, and the Sessia River.

References 

Parks in Piedmont
Tourist attractions in Piedmont
Valsesia